Qualifying for the 2019 Rugby World Cup for Asia Rugby began in May 2016 and ended in early June 2018, where the winner of the qualification process advanced to a cross-regional play-off series against the winner of Round 2 of the Oceania qualification process in June 2018.

Format
The Asia Rugby Championship, governed by Asia Rugby, was the regional qualification tournament for Rugby World Cup 2019, with Divisions 2, 1 and the Top 3 being involved in the process. The teams that competed in the 2016 Divisions 1 and 2 acted as Round 1 qualifiers, with the winner of Division 2 being promoted to Division 1, for the second regional qualification round in 2017. While the teams that competed in Division 1, contested against each other to earn the right to remain in Division 1 for the second regional qualification round, with the team placed bottom being eliminated from Rugby World Cup contention.

2017 saw Division 1 act as the main qualification tournament, where the winner advanced to Round 3 joined Hong Kong and South Korea in the top flight division.

In 2018, the winner of the 2018 Asia Rugby Championship, Round 3, advanced to the cross-regional playoff series against Oceania 4 for a repechage berth.

Entrants
Ten teams competed during for the 2019 Rugby World Cup – Asian qualification; teams world rankings are prior to the first Asian qualification match on 8 May 2016 and bold nations denotes teams have previously played in a Rugby World Cup.

Round 1

The first round consisted of ten matches between 8 teams. The winner of the Asian Rugby Championship Division 2 (Round 1A), United Arab Emirates, advanced to the second round and was promoted to division 1 for 2017, while the bottom placed team in division 1 (Round 1B), Singapore, was relegated and thus eliminated from Rugby World Cup contention.

On 10 April 2015, Kazakhstan who were meant to compete in the 2016 Asian Rugby Championship Division 1 (Round 1B) withdrew from the competition and Rugby World Cup contention. Singapore were therefore promoted up to Division 1 and Thailand replaced Singapore in Division 2.

Round 1A: 2016 Asian Rugby Championship Division 2
The 2016 Asian Rugby Championship Division 2 tournament was contested by four teams in a knockout format. The tournament was held in Tashkent, Uzbekistan.

Round 1B: 2016 Asian Rugby Championship Division 1
The 2016 Asian Rugby Championship Division 1 tournament was contested by four teams in a round robin format. The tournament was held in Kuala Lumpur, Malaysia.

Round 2: 2017 Asian Rugby Championship Division 1

The 2017 Asian Rugby Championship Division 1 tournament was held in Ipoh, Malaysia, in a round-robin format.

Round 3: 2018 Asia Rugby Championship

As the winner of this round, Hong Kong advances to a Cross-regional play-off series against Oceania 4, Cook Islands to earn a berth in the Repechage tournament.

References

2019
Asia
2016 in Asian rugby union
2017 in Asian rugby union
2018 in Asian rugby union